Carlos Arthur Nuzman (born 17 March 1942) is a Brazilian lawyer and former volleyball player, having competed professionally from 1957 to 1972 and represented the national team between 1962 and 1968. Nuzman was part of the first Brazilian male volleyball team at the 1964 Summer Olympics, when the sport debuted at the Olympic Games. He later became an administrator, with the Brazilian Volleyball Confederation (CBV) and the International Olympic Committee (IOC). He was the leader of the Rio de Janeiro bid for the 2016 Summer Olympics and was subsequently appointed head of the Organizing Committee of the Olympic and Paralympic Games Rio 2016 (Rio 2016).

Biography
Nuzman was born in 1942 in Rio de Janeiro. His grandparents were Russian-Jewish immigrants.
He was president of the Brazilian Volleyball Confederation (CBV) for twenty years (1975–1995), a period where the national teams excelled at international level. Since 1995, Nuzman is the president of the Brazilian Olympic Committee (COB) and a member of the International Olympic Committee (IOC) and Pan American Sports Organization (PASO).

In 2011 he was granted Russian citizenship

Nuzman served as the head of the Rio Olympics Organizing Committee. He was also the leader of the successful Rio bid for the 2016 Summer Olympics. He was inducted into the Volleyball Hall of Fame in 2007.

October 2017 Arrest & Investigation
On 5 September 2017, a new initiative of the Car Wash operation, called, "Unfair Play", took place in Rio de Janeiro; Nuzman stands accused of bribing the International Olympic Committee to elect the city as the home of the 2016 Summer Olympics. One month later, Nuzman was arrested amid an investigation into a vote-buying scheme to bring the Olympics to Rio de Janeiro. As an honorary member of the International Olympic Committee, he was held for questioning in September 2017 by Brazilian and French authorities. They say he is a central figure in channeling $2 million to Lamine Diack, a former IOC member from Senegal who helped secure votes when Rio was picked by the IOC in 2009. After fifteen days of imprisonment, Nuzman's sentence was reduced to house arrest and probation, on the condition of delivering his passport, being restrained from both leaving Rio de Janeiro and accessing COB's facilities, and presenting himself regularly to justice. Nuzman's trial had former president Luiz Inácio Lula da Silva and famed footballer Pelé among its witnesses.

November 2021 sentenced to 30 years 
Judge Marcelo Bretas, from the 7th federal criminal court in Rio de Janeiro, sentenced the former president of the COB (Olympic Committee of Brazil), Carlos Arthur Nuzman to 30 years, 11 months and eight days in prison for the crimes of passive corruption, organization crime, money laundering and currency evasion.

The process is the result of the Unfair Play operation, which investigated the purchase of votes to choose Rio as the venue for the 2016 Olympics. Nuzman is still free to appeal the decision. His defense said the judge convicted him without evidence and that this will be corrected when the court hears the appeal.

It was the Federal Public Ministry that filed a complaint against the former president of the Olympic Committee of Brazil (COB) Carlos Arthur Nuzman, the former governor of Rio, Sérgio Cabral Filho, the businessman Arthur César de Menezes Soares Filho, the former director of operations of the Rio 2016 committee, Leonardo Gryner, Senegalese athletics leaders Lamine Diack and his son Papa Diack. As they reside in France and Senegal, the cases of foreign leaders were dismissed, as occurred with Reu Arthur, who also resides in the United States.

References

External links 
  Profile

1942 births
Living people
Volleyball players from Rio de Janeiro (city)
International Olympic Committee members
Brazilian men's volleyball players
Volleyball players at the 1964 Summer Olympics
Olympic volleyball players of Brazil
Brazilian Jews
Presidents of the Organising Committees for the Olympic Games
2016 Summer Olympics
Recipients of the Olympic Order
Brazilian people of Russian-Jewish descent